"Bold Soul Sister" is a song written by musician Ike Turner and released by R&B duo Ike & Tina Turner on their album The Hunter. The song features electric blues guitarist Albert Collins. It was released as the B-side to the single "I Know" in October 1969.

Recording and release 

Ike Turner recruited Albert Collins to add his blues guitar work on the album. Collins was not credited on the album because he was signed to Imperial Records and Ike "felt he might get sued." Collins said: "He just paid me for the session, did it in about six hours. Tina already had the material. I just went right on an played in the studio, no overdubbing at all. It was just a straight session. I took the main guitar work all the way through and Ike took the piano."

"Bold Soul Sister" was released as the B-side to the single "I Know," a cover song by Barbara George. It was the second single from the album, and was expected to do well on the charts, but it didn't reach the Billboard Hot 100 chart, peaking at No. 126 on Bubbling Under The Hot 100. Ike and Tina had previously performed "I Know" in their concerts, and released a version on the album Live!The Ike & Tina Turner Show (1965). They later released different versions on the albums Sweet Rhode Island Red (1974) and Golden Empire (1985).

In contrast to the A-side, "Bold Soul Sister" entered the charts in December 1969. Ike and Tina promoted it on The Ed Sullivan Show in January 1970 which propelled the single to No. 59 on the Hot 100 and No. 22 on the R&B chart.

Critical reception 
Billboard (October 4, 1969): "The dynamic duo had a chart winner with 'The Hunter' and 'I've Been Loving You Too Long,' and this blockbuster updating of the Barbara George hit will surpass both of those hits on both the soul and Hot 100 charts."

Track listing

Chart performance

References 

1969 songs
1969 singles
Ike & Tina Turner songs
Songs written by Ike Turner
Funk rock songs
Blue Thumb Records singles